Extraction may refer to:

Science and technology

Biology and medicine
 Comedo extraction, a method of acne treatment
 Dental extraction, the surgical removal of a tooth from the mouth

Computing and information science
 Data extraction, the process of retrieving data out of data sources
 Information extraction
 Knowledge extraction
 The process of reversing data compression, a.k.a. decompression
 The process of choosing elements from a source document, in linguistics

Other uses in science and technology
 Root extraction, in mathematics, the computation of a th root
 Extraction (chemistry), the separation of a substance from a matrix
 Primary extraction, the act of removing a spent cartridge from the chamber of a firearm
 Fragrance extraction, the process of obtaining fragrant oils and compounds from raw materials
 Resource extraction, the process of locating, acquiring and selling any resource
 Petroleum extraction, the process of recovering petroleum from the ground
 Ancestry or origin of a person

Arts and entertainment
 Extraction (2015 film), an American thriller film starring Kellan Lutz, Bruce Willis, and Gina Carano
 Extraction (2020 film), an American action film starring Chris Hemsworth
 Extraction (album), by guitarist Greg Howe
 "Extraction" (The Shield), an episode of the television series
 Dead Space: Extraction, a video game prequel to the 2008 game Dead Space
 "Extractions", a song by BS 2000 on the 2001 album Simply Mortified
 Dirty Bomb (video game), formerly known as Extraction
 Tom Clancy's Rainbow Six Extraction, 2022 video game

Other uses
 Extraction (military), the removal of someone from a hostile area to an area occupied by either friendly personnel or within friendly control
 Literary extract, in which a portion of a written work is published
 A part of the anatomy of a stroke, in rowing

See also
Extract
Extracted, a 2012 American science fiction thriller